The 1927 Pittsburgh Pirates season was a season in American baseball. That year, the Pirates won the National League pennant, which was their second in three years and their last until 1960. The team included five future Hall of Famers: Paul Waner, Lloyd Waner, Pie Traynor, Kiki Cuyler, and 20-year-old rookie Joe Cronin (who played just 12 games).

In the World Series, however, Pittsburgh was no match for the New York Yankees. They were swept in four games.

Regular season 
Paul Waner had one of his best seasons en route to being voted NL MVP. His .380 batting average and 131 RBI paced the entire circuit. Younger brother Lloyd and Traynor finished third and fifth in the batting race, respectively. Pitcher Ray Kremer won the ERA title on his way to a 19–8 record.

Season standings

Record vs. opponents

Game log

|- bgcolor="ccffcc"
| 1 || April 12 || @ Reds || 2–1 || Kremer (1–0) || Donohue || — || 37,758 || 1–0
|- bgcolor="ccffcc"
| 2 || April 14 || @ Reds || 6–2 || Meadows (1–0) || Mays || — || 4,000 || 2–0
|- bgcolor="ccffcc"
| 3 || April 15 || @ Reds || 10–6 || Mahaffey (1–0) || Rixey || Morrison (1) || — || 3–0
|- bgcolor="ffbbbb"
| 4 || April 16 || @ Cubs || 2–5 || Bush || Hill (0–1) || — || 13,000 || 3–1
|- bgcolor="ccffcc"
| 5 || April 17 || @ Cubs || 8–3 || Kremer (2–0) || Root || Morrison (2) || 45,000 || 4–1
|- bgcolor="ccffcc"
| 6 || April 18 || @ Cubs || 9–1 || Meadows (2–0) || Kaufmann || — || — || 5–1
|- bgcolor="ccffcc"
| 7 || April 21 || Reds || 3–2 || Kremer (3–0) || Rixey || — || 33,439 || 6–1
|- bgcolor="ccffcc"
| 8 || April 22 || Reds || 3–1 || Meadows (3–0) || Luque || — || 4,000 || 7–1
|- bgcolor="ffbbbb"
| 9 || April 23 || Reds || 4–6 || Donohue || Hill (0–2) || — || 15,000 || 7–2
|- bgcolor="ffbbbb"
| 10 || April 24 || @ Cardinals || 1–2 || Alexander || Aldridge (0–1) || — || — || 7–3
|- bgcolor="ffbbbb"
| 11 || April 25 || @ Cardinals || 0–1 || Haines || Kremer (3–1) || — || — || 7–4
|- bgcolor="ccffcc"
| 12 || April 26 || @ Cardinals || 9–5 || Meadows (4–0) || Sherdel || — || — || 8–4
|- bgcolor="ffbbbb"
| 13 || April 28 || Cubs || 4–16 || Root || Bush (0–1) || — || — || 8–5
|- bgcolor="ffbbbb"
| 14 || April 30 || Cubs || 4–5 || Roy || Morrison (0–1) || — || — || 8–6
|-

|- bgcolor="ccffcc"
| 15 || May 1 || @ Cubs || 7–6 || Kremer (4–1) || Root || Morrison (3) || 37,000 || 9–6
|- bgcolor="ccffcc"
| 16 || May 3 || Cardinals || 11–10 || Kremer (5–1) || Bell || — || 3,000 || 10–6
|- bgcolor="ffbbbb"
| 17 || May 4 || Cardinals || 3–8 || Haines || Cvengros (0–1) || — || 5,500 || 10–7
|- bgcolor="ffbbbb"
| 18 || May 5 || Cardinals || 2–4 || Alexander || Aldridge (0–2) || — || 5,000 || 10–8
|- bgcolor="ffbbbb"
| 19 || May 7 || @ Phillies || 5–6 || Pruett || Kremer (5–2) || — || 18,000 || 10–9
|- bgcolor="ffffff"
| 20 || May 11 || @ Braves || 4–4 (8) ||  ||  || — || — || 10–9
|- bgcolor="ccffcc"
| 21 || May 12 || @ Braves || 8–7 || Morrison (1–1) || Mogridge || — || — || 11–9
|- bgcolor="ccffcc"
| 22 || May 14 || @ Robins || 6–1 || Kremer (6–2) || Elliott || — || — || 12–9
|- bgcolor="ccffcc"
| 23 || May 15 || @ Robins || 9–6 || Morrison (2–1) || Ehrhardt || — || 22,000 || 13–9
|- bgcolor="ffbbbb"
| 24 || May 16 || @ Robins || 5–9 || Petty || Yde (0–1) || — || — || 13–10
|- bgcolor="ffbbbb"
| 25 || May 17 || @ Robins || 1–2 || Vance || Hill (0–3) || — || — || 13–11
|- bgcolor="ccffcc"
| 26 || May 18 || @ Giants || 13–6 || Aldridge (1–2) || Henry || — || — || 14–11
|- bgcolor="ccffcc"
| 27 || May 20 || @ Giants || 8–3 (12) || Meadows (5–0) || Greenfield || — || 15,000 || 15–11
|- bgcolor="ccffcc"
| 28 || May 21 || @ Giants || 6–3 || Hill (1–3) || McQuillan || — || 25,000 || 16–11
|- bgcolor="ccffcc"
| 29 || May 22 || @ Giants || 9–4 || Aldridge (2–2) || Grimes || — || 40,000 || 17–11
|- bgcolor="ccffcc"
| 30 || May 23 || @ Reds || 8–5 || Morrison (3–1) || May || — || — || 18–11
|- bgcolor="ccffcc"
| 31 || May 24 || @ Reds || 11–1 || Meadows (6–0) || Donohue || — || 2,500 || 19–11
|- bgcolor="ccffcc"
| 32 || May 25 || @ Reds || 2–0 || Hill (2–3) || Mays || — || — || 20–11
|- bgcolor="ccffcc"
| 33 || May 26 || Cardinals || 2–1 || Aldridge (3–2) || Haines || — || 5,000 || 21–11
|- bgcolor="ccffcc"
| 34 || May 27 || Cardinals || 8–7 (10) || Bush (1–1) || McGraw || — || 6,000 || 22–11
|- bgcolor="ccffcc"
| 35 || May 28 || Cardinals || 6–4 || Meadows (7–0) || Ring || — || 18,000 || 23–11
|- bgcolor="ccffcc"
| 36 || May 29 || @ Cubs || 8–5 || Hill (3–3) || Osborn || — || 30,000 || 24–11
|- bgcolor="ffbbbb"
| 37 || May 30 || Cubs || 6–7 (10) || Kaufmann || Nichols (0–1) || — || 25,000 || 24–12
|- bgcolor="ccffcc"
| 38 || May 30 || Cubs || 6–5 (10) || Aldridge (4–2) || Blake || — || 40,000 || 25–12
|- bgcolor="ccffcc"
| 39 || May 31 || Cubs || 10–9 || Hill (4–3) || Osborn || — || — || 26–12
|-

|- bgcolor="ffbbbb"
| 40 || June 1 || Phillies || 4–7 || Pruett || Meadows (7–1) || Carlson || — || 26–13
|- bgcolor="ccffcc"
| 41 || June 2 || Phillies || 7–3 || Hill (5–3) || Ferguson || — || — || 27–13
|- bgcolor="ccffcc"
| 42 || June 3 || Phillies || 11–1 || Aldridge (5–2) || Ulrich || — || — || 28–13
|- bgcolor="ccffcc"
| 43 || June 6 || Phillies || 7–5 || Hill (6–3) || Scott || — || — || 29–13
|- bgcolor="ccffcc"
| 44 || June 7 || Giants || 9–6 || Meadows (8–1) || Grimes || — || 15,000 || 30–13
|- bgcolor="ffbbbb"
| 45 || June 8 || Giants || 7–8 || Greenfield || Aldridge (5–3) || Clarkson || 15,000 || 30–14
|- bgcolor="ffbbbb"
| 46 || June 9 || Giants || 1–12 || Fitzsimmons || Bush (1–2) || — || — || 30–15
|- bgcolor="ccffcc"
| 47 || June 10 || Giants || 13–4 || Hill (7–3) || Clarkson || — || — || 31–15
|- bgcolor="ffbbbb"
| 48 || June 11 || Robins || 10–11 || Petty || Nichols (0–2) || Vance || — || 31–16
|- bgcolor="ffbbbb"
| 49 || June 12 || @ Robins || 10–11 || Plitt || Nichols (0–3) || — || 20,000 || 31–17
|- bgcolor="ccffcc"
| 50 || June 13 || Robins || 4–3 || Kremer (7–2) || Barnes || Hill (1) || — || 32–17
|- bgcolor="ccffcc"
| 51 || June 15 || Braves || 7–4 || Hill (8–3) || Robertson || — || — || 33–17
|- bgcolor="ccffcc"
| 52 || June 16 || Braves || 6–0 || Meadows (9–1) || Greenfield || — || 5,000 || 34–17
|- bgcolor="ffbbbb"
| 53 || June 17 || Braves || 7–8 || Mogridge || Dawson (0–1) || Smith || — || 34–18
|- bgcolor="ccffcc"
| 54 || June 18 || Braves || 7–4 || Kremer (8–2) || Smith || — || — || 35–18
|- bgcolor="ffbbbb"
| 55 || June 19 || @ Cubs || 7–14 || Root || Hill (8–4) || — || — || 35–19
|- bgcolor="ccffcc"
| 56 || June 20 || @ Cubs || 4–0 || Meadows (10–1) || Carlson || — || 25,000 || 36–19
|- bgcolor="ffbbbb"
| 57 || June 21 || Reds || 6–7 (10) || Mays || Morrison (3–2) || — || — || 36–20
|- bgcolor="ccffcc"
| 58 || June 22 || Reds || 11–9 || Hill (9–4) || Lucas || Aldridge (1) || — || 37–20
|- bgcolor="ffbbbb"
| 59 || June 24 || Cubs || 2–4 || Root || Meadows (10–2) || — || — || 37–21
|- bgcolor="ffbbbb"
| 60 || June 25 || Cubs || 4–6 || Carlson || Aldridge (5–4) || — || 30,000 || 37–22
|- bgcolor="ccffcc"
| 61 || June 26 || @ Cardinals || 9–3 || Hill (10–4) || Haines || — || — || 38–22
|- bgcolor="ffbbbb"
| 62 || June 27 || @ Cardinals || 5–7 || Rhem || Dawson (0–2) || — || 3,500 || 38–23
|- bgcolor="ccffcc"
| 63 || June 28 || @ Cardinals || 9–8 || Cvengros (1–1) || Keen || Hill (2) || 9,000 || 39–23
|- bgcolor="ffbbbb"
| 64 || June 29 || @ Cardinals || 9–10 || Haines || Kremer (8–3) || Reinhart || 5,000 || 39–24
|-

|- bgcolor="ccffcc"
| 65 || July 1 || Reds || 5–1 || Hill (11–4) || Luque || — || — || 40–24
|- bgcolor="ccffcc"
| 66 || July 2 || Reds || 7–6 || Cvengros (2–1) || Nehf || — || 8,000 || 41–24
|- bgcolor="ffbbbb"
| 67 || July 3 || @ Reds || 4–5 || Lucas || Dawson (0–3) || — || — || 41–25
|- bgcolor="ccffcc"
| 68 || July 4 || Cardinals || 7–2 || Meadows (11–2) || Alexander || — || — || 42–25
|- bgcolor="ccffcc"
| 69 || July 4 || Cardinals || 6–4 || Hill (12–4) || Ring || — || — || 43–25
|- bgcolor="ccffcc"
| 70 || July 5 || Cardinals || 14–2 || Aldridge (6–4) || Reinhart || — || — || 44–25
|- bgcolor="ffbbbb"
| 71 || July 7 || Cubs || 1–2 (8) || Carlson || Dawson (0–4) || — || — || 44–26
|- bgcolor="ffbbbb"
| 72 || July 8 || Cubs || 0–1 || Root || Meadows (11–3) || — || — || 44–27
|- bgcolor="ccffcc"
| 73 || July 9 || Cubs || 4–0 || Aldridge (7–4) || Brillheart || — || 23,000 || 45–27
|- bgcolor="ccffcc"
| 74 || July 12 || @ Robins || 2–1 || Hill (13–4) || Vance || — || — || 46–27
|- bgcolor="ffbbbb"
| 75 || July 13 || @ Robins || 1–2 (11) || Clark || Meadows (11–4) || — || 6,000 || 46–28
|- bgcolor="ccffcc"
| 76 || July 14 || @ Robins || 6–5 || Aldridge (8–4) || Barnes || — || — || 47–28
|- bgcolor="ccffcc"
| 77 || July 15 || @ Robins || 5–2 || Dawson (1–4) || Elliott || — || 5,000 || 48–28
|- bgcolor="ffbbbb"
| 78 || July 16 || @ Phillies || 10–11 || Decatur || Yde (0–2) || — || — || 48–29
|- bgcolor="ffbbbb"
| 79 || July 16 || @ Phillies || 9–11 || Scott || Kremer (8–4) || — || — || 48–30
|- bgcolor="ccffcc"
| 80 || July 18 || @ Phillies || 9–7 || Yde (1–2) || Kaufmann || — || — || 49–30
|- bgcolor="ccffcc"
| 81 || July 18 || @ Phillies || 6–5 || Meadows (12–4) || Ferguson || Hill (3) || — || 50–30
|- bgcolor="ffbbbb"
| 82 || July 20 || @ Phillies || 3–4 || Mitchell || Dawson (1–5) || — || — || 50–31
|- bgcolor="ccffcc"
| 83 || July 20 || @ Phillies || 6–5 || Hill (14–4) || Sweetland || — || — || 51–31
|- bgcolor="ffbbbb"
| 84 || July 21 || @ Braves || 1–2 || Greenfield || Kremer (8–5) || — || — || 51–32
|- bgcolor="ffbbbb"
| 85 || July 21 || @ Braves || 2–5 || Smith || Miljus (0–1) || — || — || 51–33
|- bgcolor="ccffcc"
| 86 || July 22 || @ Braves || 5–2 || Meadows (13–4) || Edwards || — || — || 52–33
|- bgcolor="ffbbbb"
| 87 || July 23 || @ Braves || 2–6 || Greenfield || Yde (1–3) || — || — || 52–34
|- bgcolor="ccffcc"
| 88 || July 23 || @ Braves || 4–3 (6) || Aldridge (9–4) || Wertz || — || — || 53–34
|- bgcolor="ccffcc"
| 89 || July 24 || @ Giants || 11–6 || Hill (15–4) || Barnes || — || — || 54–34
|- bgcolor="ffbbbb"
| 90 || July 24 || @ Giants || 3–9 || Grimes || Dawson (1–6) || — || 50,000 || 54–35
|- bgcolor="ffbbbb"
| 91 || July 25 || @ Giants || 0–1 || Benton || Kremer (8–6) || — || — || 54–36
|- bgcolor="ccffcc"
| 92 || July 26 || Robins || 6–5 || Meadows (14–4) || Elliott || — || — || 55–36
|- bgcolor="ccffcc"
| 93 || July 27 || Robins || 2–1 || Aldridge (10–4) || Vance || — || — || 56–36
|- bgcolor="ffbbbb"
| 94 || July 28 || Robins || 5–7 || Doak || Hill (15–5) || Clark || — || 56–37
|- bgcolor="ccffcc"
| 95 || July 29 || Robins || 4–3 || Dawson (2–6) || Plitt || — || — || 57–37
|- bgcolor="ffbbbb"
| 96 || July 30 || Braves || 2–3 (10) || Genewich || Meadows (14–5) || — || — || 57–38
|-

|- bgcolor="ffbbbb"
| 97 || August 1 || Braves || 1–4 (11) || Genewich || Aldridge (10–5) || — || — || 57–39
|- bgcolor="ffbbbb"
| 98 || August 2 || Braves || 2–5 || Greenfield || Hill (15–6) || — || — || 57–40
|- bgcolor="ccffcc"
| 99 || August 3 || Phillies || 9–6 || Dawson (3–6) || Mitchell || — || 6,500 || 58–40
|- bgcolor="ccffcc"
| 100 || August 4 || Phillies || 8–5 || Miljus (1–1) || Pruett || — || — || 59–40
|- bgcolor="ccffcc"
| 101 || August 4 || Phillies || 7–3 || Kremer (9–6) || Ulrich || — || — || 60–40
|- bgcolor="ffbbbb"
| 102 || August 5 || Phillies || 7–9 || Ferguson || Aldridge (10–6) || Ulrich || 3,500 || 60–41
|- bgcolor="ffbbbb"
| 103 || August 6 || Giants || 2–9 || Fitzsimmons || Hill (15–7) || — || — || 60–42
|- bgcolor="ccffcc"
| 104 || August 9 || Giants || 7–6 || Hill (16–7) || Fitzsimmons || — || — || 61–42
|- bgcolor="ffbbbb"
| 105 || August 10 || Giants || 3–8 || Benton || Dawson (3–7) || Henry || 10,000 || 61–43
|- bgcolor="ffbbbb"
| 106 || August 11 || @ Cardinals || 1–2 || Alexander || Aldridge (10–7) || — || — || 61–44
|- bgcolor="ffbbbb"
| 107 || August 12 || @ Cardinals || 1–2 (11) || Haines || Hill (16–8) || — || 23,945 || 61–45
|- bgcolor="ccffcc"
| 108 || August 13 || @ Cardinals || 6–2 || Meadows (15–5) || Rhem || — || — || 62–45
|- bgcolor="ccffcc"
| 109 || August 14 || @ Cardinals || 5–1 || Kremer (10–6) || Sherdel || — || 20,000 || 63–45
|- bgcolor="ffbbbb"
| 110 || August 16 || @ Giants || 4–8 || Henry || Aldridge (10–8) || — || 25,000 || 63–46
|- bgcolor="ccffcc"
| 111 || August 17 || @ Giants || 4–1 || Hill (17–8) || Fitzsimmons || — || — || 64–46
|- bgcolor="ccffcc"
| 112 || August 19 || @ Giants || 9–3 || Meadows (16–5) || Benton || — || — || 65–46
|- bgcolor="ffbbbb"
| 113 || August 19 || @ Giants || 2–5 || Grimes || Kremer (10–7) || — || 30,000 || 65–47
|- bgcolor="ccffcc"
| 114 || August 20 || @ Robins || 10–7 || Miljus (2–1) || Clark || — || 7,000 || 66–47
|- bgcolor="ccffcc"
| 115 || August 21 || @ Robins || 2–1 || Hill (18–8) || Doak || — || 20,000 || 67–47
|- bgcolor="ffbbbb"
| 116 || August 25 || @ Braves || 1–5 || Greenfield || Meadows (16–6) || — || — || 67–48
|- bgcolor="ccffcc"
| 117 || August 25 || @ Braves || 8–1 || Kremer (11–7) || Smith || — || — || 68–48
|- bgcolor="ffbbbb"
| 118 || August 26 || @ Braves || 4–6 || Robertson || Miljus (2–2) || — || — || 68–49
|- bgcolor="ffffff"
| 119 || August 29 || @ Phillies || 2–2 (6) ||  ||  || — || — || 68–49
|- bgcolor="ffbbbb"
| 120 || August 30 || @ Phillies || 2–3 (10) || Pruett || Kremer (11–8) || — || — || 68–50
|- bgcolor="ccffcc"
| 121 || August 30 || @ Phillies || 12–6 || Miljus (3–2) || Decatur || — || — || 69–50
|- bgcolor="ccffcc"
| 122 || August 31 || @ Phillies || 3–2 (13) || Hill (19–8) || Ulrich || — || — || 70–50
|- bgcolor="ccffcc"
| 123 || August 31 || @ Phillies || 7–2 || Miljus (4–2) || Scott || Cvengros (1) || — || 71–50
|-

|- bgcolor="ccffcc"
| 124 || September 1 || Cubs || 4–3 || Meadows (17–6) || Carlson || — || 18,000 || 72–50
|- bgcolor="ccffcc"
| 125 || September 2 || Cardinals || 5–3 || Kremer (12–8) || Alexander || — || — || 73–50
|- bgcolor="ccffcc"
| 126 || September 3 || Cardinals || 14–0 || Hill (20–8) || Haines || — || — || 74–50
|- bgcolor="ccffcc"
| 127 || September 4 || @ Reds || 8–4 || Aldridge (11–8) || Luque || — || — || 75–50
|- bgcolor="ffbbbb"
| 128 || September 5 || Reds || 6–8 || Rixey || Miljus (4–3) || — || — || 75–51
|- bgcolor="ffbbbb"
| 129 || September 5 || Reds || 3–4 || Donohue || Meadows (17–7) || — || — || 75–52
|- bgcolor="ccffcc"
| 130 || September 6 || Reds || 5–0 || Kremer (13–8) || May || — || — || 76–52
|- bgcolor="ffbbbb"
| 131 || September 7 || Reds || 5–6 || Lucas || Hill (20–9) || — || — || 76–53
|- bgcolor="ccffcc"
| 132 || September 9 || Phillies || 3–2 || Aldridge (12–8) || Pruett || — || — || 77–53
|- bgcolor="ccffcc"
| 133 || September 10 || Phillies || 4–0 || Kremer (14–8) || Ulrich || — || — || 78–53
|- bgcolor="ccffcc"
| 134 || September 12 || Phillies || 3–2 || Hill (21–9) || Scott || — || — || 79–53
|- bgcolor="ccffcc"
| 135 || September 13 || Braves || 6–1 || Meadows (18–7) || Greenfield || — || — || 80–53
|- bgcolor="ccffcc"
| 136 || September 13 || Braves || 5–4 || Aldridge (13–8) || Genewich || Kremer (1) || 30,000 || 81–53
|- bgcolor="ccffcc"
| 137 || September 14 || Braves || 6–2 || Kremer (15–8) || Greenfield || — || — || 82–53
|- bgcolor="ccffcc"
| 138 || September 14 || Braves || 3–0 || Miljus (5–3) || Robertson || — || — || 83–53
|- bgcolor="ccffcc"
| 139 || September 15 || Braves || 2–1 || Hill (22–9) || Smith || — || — || 84–53
|- bgcolor="ccffcc"
| 140 || September 16 || Braves || 4–3 || Meadows (19–7) || Wertz || — || — || 85–53
|- bgcolor="ccffcc"
| 141 || September 17 || Robins || 2–1 || Aldridge (14–8) || Petty || — || — || 86–53
|- bgcolor="ccffcc"
| 142 || September 17 || Robins || 6–0 || Kremer (16–8) || Elliott || — || 27,000 || 87–53
|- bgcolor="ffbbbb"
| 143 || September 19 || Robins || 0–3 || Vance || Hill (22–10) || — || — || 87–54
|- bgcolor="ffbbbb"
| 144 || September 20 || Robins || 0–3 || Doak || Meadows (19–8) || — || — || 87–55
|- bgcolor="ccffcc"
| 145 || September 21 || Robins || 4–2 || Miljus (6–3) || McWeeny || — || 6,000 || 88–55
|- bgcolor="ccffcc"
| 146 || September 22 || Giants || 5–2 || Kremer (17–8) || Benton || — || — || 89–55
|- bgcolor="ffbbbb"
| 147 || September 22 || Giants || 1–7 || Fitzsimmons || Aldridge (14–9) || — || 40,000 || 89–56
|- bgcolor="ffbbbb"
| 148 || September 23 || Giants || 5–6 || Plitt || Hill (22–11) || Benton || 18,000 || 89–57
|- bgcolor="ffbbbb"
| 149 || September 24 || Giants || 1–3 || Fitzsimmons || Meadows (19–9) || — || 40,000 || 89–58
|- bgcolor="ccffcc"
| 150 || September 25 || @ Cubs || 2–1 || Aldridge (15–9) || Bush || — || — || 90–58
|- bgcolor="ccffcc"
| 151 || September 25 || @ Cubs || 6–1 || Kremer (18–8) || Root || — || — || 91–58
|- bgcolor="ccffcc"
| 152 || September 26 || @ Cubs || 1–0 (6) || Miljus (7–3) || Nehf || — || 5,000 || 92–58
|- bgcolor="ccffcc"
| 153 || September 27 || @ Cubs || 2–1 || Kremer (19–8) || Carlson || — || 3,000 || 93–58
|- bgcolor="ffbbbb"
| 154 || September 30 || @ Reds || 1–2 || Lucas || Aldridge (15–10) || — || 2,011 || 93–59
|-

|- bgcolor="ccffcc"
| 155 || October 1 || @ Reds || 9–6 || Miljus (8–3) || Donohue || — || — || 94–59
|- bgcolor="ffbbbb"
| 156 || October 2 || @ Reds || 0–1 || Appleton || Meadows (19–10) || — || — || 94–60
|-

|-
| Legend:       = Win       = Loss       = TieBold = Pirates team member

Detailed records

Opening Day lineup

Notable transactions 
 May 9, 1927: Don Songer was purchased from the Pirates by the New York Giants.

Roster

Player stats

Batting

Starters by position 
Note: Pos = Position; G = Games played; AB = At bats; H = Hits; Avg. = Batting average; HR = Home runs; RBI = Runs batted in

Other batters 
Note: G = Games played; AB = At bats; H = Hits; Avg. = Batting average; HR = Home runs; RBI = Runs batted in

Pitching

Starting pitchers 
Note: G = Games pitched; IP = Innings pitched; W = Wins; L = Losses; ERA = Earned run average; SO = Strikeouts

Other pitchers 
Note: G = Games pitched; IP = Innings pitched; W = Wins; L = Losses; ERA = Earned run average; SO = Strikeouts

Relief pitchers 
Note: G = Games pitched; W = Wins; L = Losses; SV = Saves; ERA = Earned run average; SO = Strikeouts

Awards and honors

League top five finishers 
Carmen Hill
 #3 in NL in wins (22)

Ray Kremer
 NL leader in ERA (2.47)

Lee Meadows
 NL leader in complete games (25)

Pie Traynor
 #5 in NL in batting average (.342)

Lloyd Waner
 NL leader in runs scored (133)
 #3 in NL in batting average (.355)

Paul Waner
 NL leader in batting average (.380)
 NL leader in RBI (131)
 NL leader in triples (18)
 #2 in NL in on-base percentage (.437)
 #2 in NL in doubles (42)
 #4 in NL in runs scored (114)
 #4 in NL in slugging percentage (.549)

1927 World Series

Game 1 
October 5, 1927, at Forbes Field in Pittsburgh, Pennsylvania

Game 2 
October 6, 1927, at Forbes Field in Pittsburgh, Pennsylvania

Game 3 
October 7, 1927, at Yankee Stadium in New York City

Game 4 
October 8, 1927, at Yankee Stadium in New York City

References

External links
 1927 Pittsburgh Pirates team page at Baseball Reference
 1927 Pittsburgh Pirates Page at Baseball Almanac

Pittsburgh Pirates seasons
Pittsburgh Pirates season
National League champion seasons
Pittsburg Pir